Kiphisos was a town on the coast of ancient Cilicia, inhabited during Roman and Byzantine times. 

Its site is located near Yeşilovacık in Asiatic Turkey.

References

Populated places in ancient Cilicia
Former populated places in Turkey
Populated places of the Byzantine Empire
Roman towns and cities in Turkey
History of Mersin Province